Rancho Palos Verdes (Spanish for "Green Sticks Ranch")  is a coastal city located in Los Angeles County, California atop the bluffs of the Palos Verdes Peninsula, neighboring other cities in the Palos Verdes Hills, including Palos Verdes Estates, Rolling Hills and Rolling Hills Estates. Rancho Palos Verdes is known for its dramatic views of the Pacific Ocean, Santa Catalina Island, and Los Angeles, as well as for its highly-ranked schools, extensive horse and hiking trails,
and for being one of the wealthiest ZIP codes in the United States in terms of household income and property prices.

Geography

Demographics

2010
The 2010 United States Census reported that Rancho Palos Verdes had a population of 41,643. The racial makeup of Rancho Palos Verdes was 25,698 (61.7%) White (56.0% Non-Hispanic White), 1,015 (2.4%) African American, 80 (0.2%) Native American, 12,077 (29.0%) Asian, 41 (0.1%) Pacific Islander, 748 (1.8%) from other races, and 1,984 (4.8%) from two or more races. Hispanic or Latino of any race were 3,556 persons (8.5%).

The census reported that 41,303 people (99.2% of the population) lived in households, 313 (0.8%) lived in non-institutionalized group quarters, and 27 (0.1%) were institutionalized.

There were 15,561 households, of which 5,187 (33.3%) had children under the age of 18 living in them, 10,465 (67.3%) were opposite-sex married couples living together, 1,218 (7.8%) had a female householder with no husband present, and 460 (3.0%) had a male householder with no wife present. There were 304 (2.0%) unmarried opposite-sex partnerships and 85 (0.5%) same-sex married couples or partnerships. 2,936 households (18.9%) were made up of individuals, and 1,810 (11.6%) had someone living alone who was 65 years of age or older. The average household size was 2.65. There were 12,143 families (78.0% of all households); the average family size was 3.03.

The population was diverse in age terms, with 9,248 people (22.2%) under the age of 18, 2,352 people (5.6%) aged 18 to 24, 7,045 people (16.9%) aged 25 to 44, 13,344 people (32.0%) aged 45 to 64, and 9,654 people (23.2%) aged 65 or older. The median age was 47.8 years. For every 100 females, there were 94.3 males. For every 100 females aged 18 and over, there were 90.1 males.

The homeowner vacancy rate was 0.6%; the rental vacancy rate was 6.4%. 33,015 people (79.3% of the population) lived in owner-occupied housing units, and 8,288 people (19.9%) lived in rental housing units.

According to the 2010 United States Census, Rancho Palos Verdes had a median household income of $118,893, with 4.5% of the population living below the federal poverty line.

2020 

Since 2020, population has decreased to 40,948.  It is the 205th largest city in California and the 955th largest city in the United States.  Rancho Palos Verdes is currently declining at a rate of -0.71% annually and its population has decreased by -1.67% since the most recent census in 2010.  Rancho Palos Verdes reached its highest population of 42,401 in 2015.

The average household income in Rancho Palos Verdes has risen to $181,600 in 2020.

Education
The city is served by the Palos Verdes Peninsula Unified School District (PVPUSD), which includes Palos Verdes Peninsula High School and Palos Verdes High School, and the Los Angeles Unified School District (LAUSD, in the Eastview area of the city). Children living in Eastview have the option of attending public school in either the PVPUSD or the LAUSD. In 1992 84.5% of relevant voters voted approved Proposition Z to move the LAUSD portion to PVPUSD but Stephen E. O'Neil, a judge of the Los Angeles Superior Court, blocked the transfer.

Rolling Hills Country Day School (K-8) and Chadwick School (K-12) are private schools that serve the area. Marymount California University, a private liberal arts institution, offered bachelor's and master's degrees until it closed in August 2022. The Salvation Army College for Officer Training at Crestmont is a 2-year college located on the former Marymount College Hawthorne Campus built in 1960 in Rancho Palos Verdes.

The public school district which serves Rancho Palos Verdes consistently ranks top in the nation. The survey conducted by U.S. News in 2013 reported that the PVPHS ranked 156th in the nation and 24th in the state, while Palos Verdes High School (PVHS) in Palos Verdes Estates trailed closely behind, at 269th in the nation and 43rd in the state.

The Palos Verdes Library District operates three libraries on the Palos Verdes Peninsula, with Miraleste Library in Rancho Palos Verdes.

Government
Rancho Palos Verdes is a General Law city, meaning that it has no charter. The City elects five council members at large to four-year terms in staggered, non-partisan elections on the first Tuesday in November of every odd-numbered year. The mayor and mayor pro tempore are elected annually by the residing city council members.

As of February 16, 2021, the city council consists of:

 Mayor:         Eric Alegria
 Mayor Pro Tem: David L. Bradley
 Councilmember: John Cruikshank
 Councilmember: Barbara Ferraro
 Councilmember: Ken Dyda

Mayor Alegria and Mayor Pro Tem Cruikshank have served on the Rancho Palos Verdes City Council since November 2017. Councilmember Dyda, 91 years old, was also elected to the original city council when the city was established in 1973. Councilmembers Bradley and Ferraro, (Ferraro previously served as mayor over a decade ago then left the council upon finishing her term of office before running again in 2019), were recently elected in November 2019.

As outlined in the City's Municipal Code, the city council hires a city manager to manage the day-to-day operation of the City and its staff. The current city manager is Ara Mihranian.

County, state, and federal representation
In the County of Los Angeles, Rancho Palos Verdes is located in the 4th Supervisorial District, represented by Janice Hahn.

Economy

Top employers
According to the City's 2020 Comprehensive Annual Financial Report, the top employers in the city were:

Emergency services
Fire protection in Rancho Palos Verdes is provided by the Los Angeles County Fire Department, and ambulance transport by McCormick Ambulance Service.

The Los Angeles County Sheriff's Department operates the Lomita Station in the City of Lomita and provides law enforcement services for Rancho Palos Verdes.

The Los Angeles County Department of Health Services operates Harbor-UCLA Medical Center in the Harbor Gateway, Los Angeles, near Torrance and serving Rancho Palos Verdes. Other nearby hospitals include Torrance Memorial Medical Center and Providence Little Company of Mary Hospital, both located in Torrance and San Pedro.

Landmarks

Point Vicente Lighthouse

The Point Vicente Lighthouse, built in 1926, is on the National Register of Historic Places. It is between Point Loma Lighthouse to the south and Point Conception Lighthouse to the north. The lighthouse was added to the National Register of Historic Places in 1980. The lighthouse is owned by the United States federal government and is managed by the United States Coast Guard.

Wayfarers Chapel
At another location along the coast, Wayfarers Chapel, designed by Lloyd Wright (the son of Frank Lloyd Wright) and built between 1949 and 1951, is also on the National Register of Historic Places.  It is noted for its unique organic architecture and location on cliffs above the Pacific Ocean. It is part of the Swedenborgian Church of North America and serves as a memorial to the 18th century scientist and theosopher, Emanuel Swedenborg.

The church is popular for weddings, due to its sweeping views of the Pacific Ocean.  The church was featured in the Fox teen drama television series The O.C., as the site of weddings and funerals. It was also featured briefly on the American science fiction television series Sliders, and in an episode of The Rockford Files (2 Into 5.56 Won't Go). In addition, the chapel was part of the final marriage scene in Innerspace, an episode in season four of 90210. The chapel was featured in one of the final scenes in the 2014 movie Endless Love, as well as being featured in the ABC television series  Revenge. Also featured in The Rockford Files season 2 episode 10.  Marina and the Diamond's 'Baby' music video's wedding scene was filmed at the chapel, and The CW show,  Lucifer

Portuguese Bend and Palos Verdes Nature Preserve
The Portuguese Bend region is the largest area of natural vegetation remaining on the Palos Verdes Peninsula, in Los Angeles County, California.
Though once slated for development including the projected route of Crenshaw Boulevard, the area is geologically unstable and is unsuitable for building.

The Portuguese Bend landslide, one of the largest continuously moving landslides in North America, is located along the southern coastal area. Together with the Palos Verdes Peninsula Land Conservancy in 2009, the city completed the acquisition of a total of two square miles of open space, the Palos Verdes Nature Preserve, the largest preserve of coastal open space north of San Diego and south of Santa Barbara.

Terranea Resort
The site of the former Marineland of the Pacific (1954–87) was redeveloped and is now occupied by the Terranea Resort.  Terranea Resort is a high-end Mediterranean-inspired resort that sits on a 102-acre estate that features 582 guest rooms and suites.

Trump National Golf Club
Trump National Golf Club Los Angeles is a public golf club located in Rancho Palos Verdes. The course was designed by Pete Dye and Donald J. Trump Signature Design. It is owned by The Trump Organization. The course was about to open when a landslide occurred and the 18th hole slid toward the Pacific Ocean. The Ocean Trails Golf Club subsequently went into bankruptcy, and on November 26, 2002 Trump bought the property for $27 million, intending to redesign the course. It includes a  clubhouse. It is ranked among the Top 100 Courses You Can Play by Golf Magazine.

Salvation Army College for Officer Training
The Salvation Army's College for Officer Training occupies the former built 1960 campus of Marymount College complete with laboratories, classrooms and dormitory residence halls in Rancho Palos Verdes.

Peafowls, peacocks, and butterflies
As with other cities on the Palos Verdes Peninsula, the city has had to find ways to control the population of wild peafowl. Frank A. Vanderlip spearheaded a group that bought  and began development of the peninsula. He is credited with introducing the birds here around 1910. The city has an abundance of peafowl.

At Hesse Park in 1982, the city of Rancho Palos Verdes began construction that destroyed one of the largest remaining population of endangered butterfly, the Palos Verdes blue (Glaucopsyche lygdamus palosverdesensis). This resulted in a lawsuit against the city that was ultimately dismissed for the reason that a city as a legal entity could not be held responsible.

Notable residents

Notable residents of Rancho Palos Verdes include Merrill Moses, the Olympic water polo player, who lived there. Major League Baseball pitcher Eli Morgan was born and grew up there. World number one tennis player Pete Sampras grew up here from 7 years old. Top-10 tennis player Eliot Teltscher also lived there, and top-20 tennis player Taylor Fritz lives there. Professional basketball player Shawn Weinstein is from there.  Christen Press, a forward for the United States women's national soccer team and two-time World Cup champion, grew up there.  Professional poker player Barry Greenstein and artist John Van Hamersveld have resided in Rancho Palos Verdes.

Chester Bennington of rock band Linkin Park was a longtime resident of Palos Verdes.  Christopher John Boyce, a former American defense industry employee who was convicted for selling United States spy satellite secrets to the Soviet Union in the 1970s, grew up there. The author Joan Didion, lived in the Portuguese Bend Club area of Rancho Palos Verdes for a brief period of time with her husband and daughter. Chris Doughty, Massachusetts politician and businessman was born and raised in Palos Verdes, and was eliminated in the primary for the 2022 Gubernatorial race for the Republican Party.

References

External links

 
 

Cities in Los Angeles County, California
Incorporated cities and towns in California
Palos Verdes Peninsula
Populated coastal places in California
Populated places established in 1846
1973 establishments in California
South Bay, Los Angeles